Cyanopepla cinctipennis is a moth of the subfamily Arctiinae. It was described by Francis Walker in 1865. It is found in Colombia and Ecuador.

References

Cyanopepla
Moths described in 1865